The 2019 Shenzhen F.C. season is Shenzhen F.C.'s 1st consecutive season in the Chinese Super League ever since it started back in the 2004 season and 1st consecutive season in the top flight of Chinese football. This season Shenzhen F.C. participates in the Chinese Super League and Chinese FA Cup.

Players

Squad
As of 17 July 2019

Technical Staff

Transfers and loans

Squad statistics

Appearances and goals

 

 

 

|-
! colspan=14 style=background:#dcdcdc; text-align:center| Players transferred out during the season

Disciplinary Record

Friendlies

Pre-season

Competitions

Chinese Super League

Table

Results summary

Results by round

Matches

Source:

Chinese FA Cup

Fourth round

References

Shenzhen F.C. seasons
Shenzhen